Charles Ashton may refer to:

Charles Ashton (historian) (1848–1899), Welsh literary historian and bibliophile
Charles Ashton (divine) (1665–1752), scholar and divine
Charles Ashton (actor) (1884–1968), British actor and novelist

See also
Ernest Charles Ashton (1873–1956), Canadian soldier
Charlie Aston (1875–1931), English footballer